Los Reyes Del Perreo, by Alexis & Fido, is a collection of nine of their biggest songs plus five new ones. It was released on September 19, 2006 by Sony BMG Latin.

Track listing 
 Decidir (produced by Monserrate & DJ Urba)
 Me Quiere Besar (produced by Mekka "La Nueva Amenaza")
 Dulce (ft. Arcángel & De La Ghetto) (produced by Monserrate & DJ Urba)
 La Llamada (produced by Danny Fornaris)
 Descontrol (ft. Los Yetzons) (produced by Monserrate & DJ Urba)
 Tocale Bocina (produced by DJ Nelson, DJ Sonic, Noriega) 
 El Tiburón (ft. Baby Ranks) (produced by Luny Tunes, Nely) 
 Gata Michu Michu  (produced by DJ Memo) 
 Piden Perreo (ft. Wisin & Yandel) (produced by Luny Tunes)
 Te Pase El Rolo (produced by Luny Tunes) 
 El Palo (produced by N.O.T.T.Y. & DJ Sonic)
 La Calle Me Llama (ft. Yandel) (produced by Luny Tunes)
 Ella Le Gusta (produced by Luny Tunes & Noriega)
 Jinete (ft. Wisin) (produced by Monserrate & DJ Urba)

Chart performance

References

Alexis & Fido albums
2006 compilation albums
Albums produced by Luny Tunes
Albums produced by Noriega